Rinchenling Gompa (monastery) is an ancient Tibetan Buddhist monastery in Nepal located in Limi Valley of Humla district near the Tibet border at an altitude of about 3500 m msl.

History
The monastery was founded by Rinchen Zangpo during 10th or 11th century AD. Rinchen Zangpo was a principle translator of the Buddhist scriptures from Sanskrit into the Tibetan language. He actively constructed Buddhist temples and monasteries during his lifetime. Legends say that Rinchen Zangpo built a total of 108 temples.

Current building
The monastery is a three-store building with an area of about 36 m x 32 m surrounded by a rectangular courtyard. The upper two stories  have assembly halls, a library, and a store room. The monks’ quarters, kitchens, and store rooms for ordinary objects are on the ground floor. The assembly room in the northern side houses a large four-fold image of Vairocana surrounded on its three sides by bodhisattvas.

Flood risk
The monastery has a flood risk from the nearby glacial lake. In 2011, it partially burst, which caused damage to many structures in Halji Village.

References

Buddhist monasteries in Nepal
10th-century establishments in Nepal
11th-century establishments in Nepal
Buildings and structures in Humla District